Lushan County is a county of Sichuan Province, China. It is under the administration of Ya'an city.

Historical Monuments
An ancient monument, located in Lushan County and dating to 205 AD of the Eastern Han Dynasty, is the remains of the mausoleum of Fan Min. It is known as "Fan Min's Gate Towers and Sculptures", and,
according to the archaeologist Chêng Tê-k'un (1957), includes the earliest extant full-size tortoise-born stele.
The stele has rounded top with a dragon design in low relief - a precursor to the "two intertwined dragons" design that was very common on such steles even in the Ming and Qing Dynasties, over a thousand years later.

2013 earthquake

The earthquake was centered in the district and causing more than 100 deaths and property damage directly and indirectly by the quake and by landslides. In an immediate response, the People's Liberation Army sent about 8,000 soldiers to the impact site, as well as 1,400 provincial rescue workers and 120 support vehicles.

Climate

Notes

References
 (Posthumous publication, based on research done in 1909-1917)

County-level divisions of Sichuan